ANZ Fiji is the largest bank in Fiji and has about a 40% market share. ANZ Fiji currently operates 13 branches country-wide.

History
ANZ Fiji traces its presence in Fiji back to 1873 through an acquisition. Investors from Auckland established the Fiji Banking and Commercial Trading Company Limited in 1873.  However, the bank's owners sold it in 1876 to the Bank of New Zealand (BNZ);  ANZ Group acquired BNZ’s operations in 1990 after 114 years of Bank of New Zealand ownership.

ANZ’s own entry into the Pacific region dates back to 16 December 1880 when the Union Bank of Australia (est.1837) opened a branch in the old capital of Fiji, Levuka. However, the bank closed the branch in 1895. In 1951, Union Bank’s successor, ANZ, returned to Fiji with a representative office that it upgraded to a branch.

In 1985, ANZ acquired Barclays Bank’s operations, which Barclays had established in 1973. In 2001, ANZ bought Bank of Hawaii’s Bankoh subsidiary, which had three branches throughout Fiji. Bankoh had entered the Fijian banking market in 1993.

In February 2017, ANZ Fiji appointed Saud Abdul Minam as CEO of ANZ Fiji. Previously, Saud Abdul Minam served as Head of Commercial, Pacific at Australia & New Zealand Banking Group Limited. During his tenure as Head of Commercial, ANZ has announced free access to its internet banking platform and website for Vodafone Fiji users.

References

Sources
Butlin, S. J. 1961. Australia and New Zealand Bank: The Bank of Australasia and the Union Bank of Australia Limited, 1828-1951. London: Longmans, p. 207.
Chappell, N.M. 1961. New Zealand Banker’s Hundred: A History of the Bank of New Zealand, 1861-1961. Wellington: Bank of New Zealand.
Narube, S. and B.T. Whiteside. 1985. “Financial Institutions and Markets in Fiji”. In M. T. Skully, ed. Financial Institutions and Markets in the Southwest Pacific. London: Macmillan Press.

Banks of Fiji
Australia and New Zealand Banking Group
Corporate subsidiaries
Banks established in 1880
1880 establishments in Fiji